Harold John Somerville (2 July 1923 – 21 January 1998) was an Australian rules footballer who played with North Melbourne in the Victorian Football League (VFL).

Notes

External links 

1923 births
1998 deaths
Australian rules footballers from Victoria (Australia)
North Melbourne Football Club players
Warrnambool Football Club players